Silver Burdett was an American primary education textbook publishing imprint owned by Pearson Education, which is a division of media conglomerate Pearson PLC.

History
Silver Burdett first formed as a company in 1888 when Frank W. Burdett purchased a controlling interest in the textbook publishing company, Silver & Company. In 1962, it was acquired by Time Inc., and it became the distributor of Time-Life Books to schools and libraries. In 1965 it became the first division of the General Learning Corporation, a multi-million dollar collaboration between Time Inc. and General Electric. Simon & Schuster purchased it in 1986, and merged it with Ginn & Company, a leading el-hi (elementary school and high school) textbook publisher - which formed the imprint Silver Burdett & Ginn. In 1998, Pearson PLC acquired Simon & Schuster's educational businesses (which included Silver Burdett & Ginn) from S&S parent Viacom, and created Pearson Education.

Termination
Pearson closed Silver Burdett in 1999.

References

Book publishing companies of the United States
Educational publishing companies
Former Viacom subsidiaries
Pearson plc
Publishing companies established in 1888